Manish Vardhan (born 6 October 1983) is an Indian first-class cricketer who played more than 60 matches for Jharkhand.

References

External links
 

1983 births
Living people
Indian cricketers
Jharkhand cricketers
People from Purnia